Mark Anthony Lewis-Francis, MBE (born 4 September 1982) is a retired British track and field athlete, specifically a sprinter, who specialised in the 100 metres and was an accomplished regular of GB 4 x 100m relay. A renowned junior, his greatest sporting achievement at senior level has been to anchor the Great Britain and Northern Ireland 4 x 100 metres relay team to a gold medal at the 2004 Summer Olympics. Individually, Lewis-Francis has won the silver medal in the 100 m at the 2010 European Athletics Championships and silver medal in the 2010 Commonwealth Games, Men's 100m final and numerous indoor medals.

Lewis-Francis is a member of the Birchfield Harriers athletics club and is also known as the "Darlaston Dart".

Early career
Lewis-Francis burst onto the scene at an early age but did not attend the 2000 Summer Olympics, instead competing at the World Junior Championships, in which he won gold. Lewis-Francis became Britain's top 100 m sprinter after Dwain Chambers was banned for drug use in 2003. He failed to make the final of the 100 m at the 2004 Summer Olympics, but days later ran the final leg of the 4 × 100 m relay, famously holding off former Olympic champion and world record holder Maurice Greene, allowing the Great Britain team to narrowly win in a time of 38.07 seconds. The gold medal team consisted of Lewis-Francis, Marlon Devonish, Darren Campbell and Jason Gardener.

As the last of the four in both race and alphabetical order, Lewis-Francis became the fiftieth man to win a gold medal for Great Britain in Athletics at the Olympics.

Despite this and other Olympic and World relay success, his junior success has not as yet translated to consistent performance at the highest level in individual championships. His surprise silver medal in the 100m at the 2010 European Athletics Championships was his first individual medal at senior level.

Transition to seniors
In 2001 Lewis-Francis won a World Athletics Championships 100 m quarter-final heat in 9.97 seconds, which would have been a junior world record, but a wind gauge malfunction meant it was unratifiable.

Unusually, Lewis-Francis' times have become slower as he has moved into his twenties. Although athletes tend to peak around their late 20s in the sprints, Lewis-Francis peak to date remains his performances while in his late teens. He has turned down numerous invitations to train with the top sprinters like Justin Gatlin in America, and prefers to stay living in England on the grounds that he would get 'home-sick.' However he did leave his home town of Birmingham in 2005 to move to Eton and train with a new coach.

Return to top level
After a year out with an Achilles injury, Lewis-Francis engaged in warm weather training in California with his new coach Linford Christie. Putting a history of injuries behind him, he set his sights on making the 100 m final at the Berlin World Championships. However, he failed to make the team.

Following a late call up to the Great Britain squad, in July 2010 he won silver at the 2010 European Athletics Championships in a time of 10.18 seconds, his first major individual medal at senior level. Unfortunately, three days later in a heat of the 4 × 100 m relay, he blundered during the baton exchange that resulted in the team not making the final. Nonetheless, he was selected to represent Europe at the 2010 IAAF Continental Cup and he took the bronze medal while European champion Christophe Lemaitre won the race. Lewis-Francis gained a second silver of the season at the 2010 Commonwealth Games: he recorded a season's best run of 10.15 seconds in the qualifiers and he ran 10.20 seconds to finish as runner-up behind Lerone Clarke in the final, having pulled himself back into contention after his starting blocks slipped.

Lewis-Francis joined the British bobsleigh team in August 2015, joining former track teammates Simeon Williamson and Joel Fearon in the team, with an aim to compete in the 2018 Winter Olympics in Pyeongchang whilst also hoping to be selected for the sprints at the 2016 Summer Olympics in Rio de Janeiro.

Drugs tests
In December 2007, after the Christine Ohuruogu affair, Lewis-Francis was one of three British athletes to acknowledge having missed two drugs tests.

See also
 List of sportspeople sanctioned for doping offences

References

External links
 
 Interview from The Independent

1982 births
Living people
People from Darlaston
People educated at Stuart Bathurst Catholic High School
English male sprinters
English Olympic medallists
Olympic athletes of Great Britain
Olympic gold medallists for Great Britain
Athletes (track and field) at the 2004 Summer Olympics
Commonwealth Games gold medallists for England
Athletes (track and field) at the 2002 Commonwealth Games
Athletes (track and field) at the 2006 Commonwealth Games
Athletes (track and field) at the 2010 Commonwealth Games
World Athletics Championships medalists
World Athletics Indoor Championships medalists
European Athletics Championships medalists
Doping cases in athletics
English sportspeople in doping cases
Black British sportspeople
English sportspeople of Ghanaian descent
Commonwealth Games medallists in athletics
Birchfield Harriers
Medalists at the 2004 Summer Olympics
Commonwealth Games silver medallists for England
Olympic gold medalists in athletics (track and field)
Members of the Order of the British Empire
Medallists at the 2010 Commonwealth Games